Marwa Ahmed Hussein Arafat (born 19 June 1978) is an Egyptian hammer thrower. Her personal best throw is 68.48 metres, achieved in February 2005 in Cairo. This is the Egyptian record, a former African record, and ranks her as the second best African thrower after Amy Sène.

She failed a drug test at a competition in August 2010 and was banned from the sport for two years.

Achievements

See also
List of doping cases in athletics

References

External links

1978 births
Living people
Egyptian female hammer throwers
Athletes (track and field) at the 2004 Summer Olympics
Olympic athletes of Egypt
Doping cases in athletics
African Games gold medalists for Egypt
African Games medalists in athletics (track and field)
Athletes (track and field) at the 1999 All-Africa Games
Athletes (track and field) at the 2003 All-Africa Games
Athletes (track and field) at the 2007 All-Africa Games